A walled village is a type of large traditional multi-family communal living structure found in China, that is designed to be easily defensible. It is completely surrounded by thick defensive walls, protecting the residents from the attack of wild animals and enemies. Usually, people living in the walled village are extended families or clans sharing the same surname. Walled villages are still found in southern China and Hong Kong.

History
During the Ming and Qing dynasties, the shore of Guangdong suffered from pirates. The area of Hong Kong was particular vulnerable to pirates' attacks. Winding shores, hilly lands and islands and far from administrative centres made Hong Kong an excellent hideout for pirates.  Villages, both Punti and Hakka, built walls against pirates. Some villages even protected themselves using cannons. In Punti Cantonese, Wai (圍, Walled) and Tsuen (村, Village) were once synonyms.

Ancestral halls
The ancestral hall was the most important building in a village. It housed the soul tablets of the ancestors of the villagers and the villagers went there to worship. Ancestral halls were also used as schools.

See also
 Hakka walled village
 Walled villages of Hong Kong
Chinese clans
 Dapengcheng, a walled village in Shenzhen
 Fujian Tulou
 Kowloon Walled City

References

External links
 UNESCO
 From the Earth The walled villages of the Fujian Hakka

Architecture in China
Chinese architectural history
Fortified_settlements